The 1988 Rothmans Matchroom League was a professional non-ranking snooker tournament that was played from 23 January to 15 May 1988.

Steve Davis topped the table and won the tournament. Tony Meo recorded a maximum break in his match against Stephen Hendry. 


Prize fund
The breakdown of prize money for this year is shown below:
Winner: £70,000
Runner-up: £30,000
3rd place: £25,000
4th place: £20,000
5th Place: £17,000
6th Place: £15,000
7th Place: £13,000
8th Place: £11,000
9th Place: £9,000
10th Place: £5,000
Highest break: £5,000
Total: £220,000

League phase

If points were level then match wins, followed by most frames won determined their positions. If two players had an identical record then the result in their match determined their positions. If that ended 4–4 then the player who got to four first was higher.

 23 January – Thermae Palace Hotel, Ostend
 Cliff Thorburn 6–2 Dennis Taylor
 24 January – Thermae Palace Hotel, Ostend
 Steve Davis 4–4 Stephen Hendry
 24 January – Cardiff
 Tony Meo 5–3 Neal Foulds
 Jimmy White 6–2 Terry Griffiths
 13 February – Ritz Billiard Club, Helsinki
 Willie Thorne 5–3 Joe Johnson
 13 February – Antrim Forum, Antrim
 Terry Griffiths 4–4 Cliff Thorburn
 Steve Davis 5–3 Neal Foulds
 14 February – The George and Dragon Pub, Luxembourg
 Jimmy White 5–3 Tony Meo
 14 February – Newry Lesuire Centre, Newry
 Neal Foulds 5–3 Cliff Thorburn
 Terry Griffiths 5–3 Dennis Taylor
 19 February – Aston Villa Sports and Leisure Centre, Birmingham
 Jimmy White 5–3 Dennis Taylor
 20 February – The Winding Wheel, Chesterfield
 Stephen Hendry 6–2 Tony Meo
 Dennis Taylor 4–4 Willie Thorne
 20 February – Beach Plaza Hotel. Monte Carlo
 Neal Foulds 4–4 Terry Griffiths
 21 February – Gateshead Lesuire Centre, Gateshead
 Willie Thorne 6–2 Stephen Hendry
 Jimmy White 6–2 Joe Johnson
 21 February – Beach Plaza Hotel, Monte Carlo
 Steve Davis 5–3 Cliff Thorburn
 20 March – Central Hall, York
 Steve Davis 5–3 Tony Meo
 20 March – Woodford Leisure Centre, Kingston-upon-Hull
 Neal Foulds 5–3 Willie Thorne
 Dennis Taylor 8–0 Joe Johnson
 2 April – New Victoria Theatre, Stoke-on-Trent
 Tony Meo 4–4 Willie Thorne
 Steve Davis 5–3 Dennis Taylor
 3 April – The Hotel Andalucia Plaza Casino, Marbella
 Neal Foulds 6–2 Joe Johnson
 4 April – The Hotel Andalucia Plaza Casino, Marbella
 Stephen Hendry 7–1 Dennis Taylor
 4 April – Corn Exchange, Cambridge
 Willie Thorne 6–2 Cliff Thorburn
 Terry Griffiths 5–3 Joe Johnson
 9 April – Cleethorpes Leisure Centre, Cleethorpes
 Tony Meo 4–4 Dennis Taylor
 Steve Davis 4–4 Terry Griffiths
 9 April – Northgate Arena Leisure Centre, Chester
 Neal Foulds 4–4 Stephen Hendry
 Cliff Thorburn 6–2 Jimmy White
 10 April – Thornaby Pavilion Leisure Centre, Thornaby-on-Tees
 Tony Meo 4–4 Cliff Thorburn
 Stephen Hendry 7–1 Joe Johnson
 10 April – Victoria Community Centre, Crewe
 Willie Thorne 4–4 Terry Griffiths
 Jimmy White 4–4 Neal Foulds
 7 May – Perdiswell Sports Centre, Worcester
 Tony Meo 6–2 Joe Johnson
 Jimmy White 4–4 Stephen Hendry
 7 May – Granby Halls Leisure Centre, Leicester
 Steve Davis 5–3 Willie Thorne
 8 May – Royal Concert Hall, Nottingham
 Steve Davis 8–0 Jimmy White
 8 May – Swansea Leisure Centre, Swansea
 Cliff Thorburn 7–1 Joe Johnson
 Stephen Hendry 6–2 Terry Griffiths
 13 May – Brighton Centre, Brighton
 Steve Davis 4–4 Joe Johnson
 14 May – Crest Hotel, Antwerp
 Terry Griffiths 5–3 Tony Meo
 14 May – The Court Centre, Peterborough
 Stephen Hendry 6–2 Cliff Thorburn
 15 May – Fairfield Halls, Croydon
 Neal Foulds 6–2 Dennis Taylor
 Willie Thorne 6–2 Jimmy White

References

Premier League Snooker
1988 in snooker
1988 in British sport